The extinct Borophaginae form one of three subfamilies found within the canid family. The other two canid subfamilies are the extinct Hesperocyoninae and extant Caninae.

Origin

The Borophaginae descended from the subfamily Hesperocyoninae. The earliest and most primitive borophagine is the genus Archaeocyon, which is a small fox-sized animal mostly found in the fossil beds in western North America. The borophagines soon diversified into several major groups. They evolved to become considerably larger than their predecessors, and filled a wide range of niches in late Cenozoic North America, from small omnivores to powerful, bear-sized carnivores, such as Epicyon.

Species
There are 66 identified borophagine species, including 18 new ones that range from the Orellan to Blancan ages. A phylogenetic analysis of the species was conducted using cladistic methods, with Hesperocyoninae as an archaic group of canids, as the outgroup. Aside from some transitional forms, Borophaginae can be organized into four major clades: Phlaocyonini, Cynarctina, Aelurodontina, and Borophagina (all erected as new tribes or subtribes). The Borophaginae begins with a group of small fox-sized genera, such as Archaeocyon, Oxetocyon, Otarocyon, and Rhizocyon, in the Orellan through early Arikareean stages. These canids reached their maximum diversity of species around 28 million years ago.

Often generically referred to as "bone-crushing dogs" for their powerful teeth and jaws, and hyena-like features (although their dentition was more primitive than that of hyenas), their fossils are abundant and widespread; in all likelihood, they were probably one of the top predators of their ecosystems. Their good fossil record has also allowed a detailed reconstruction of their phylogeny, showing that the group was highly diverse in its heyday. All Borophaginae had a small fifth toe on their rear feet (similar to the toes that bear dew claws on the front feet), where as all modern Caninae have only four toes normally.

Noteworthy genera in this group are Aelurodon, Epicyon, and Borophagus (=Osteoborus). According to Xiaoming Wang, the Borophaginae played broad ecological roles that are performed by at least three living carnivoran families, Canidae (which they were a part of), Hyaenidae, and Procyonidae.

Classification
Borophagine taxonomy, following Wang et al. (million years=in existence)
Family Canidae
Subfamily †Borophaginae
†Archaeocyon 33—26 Ma, existing 
†Oxetocyon 33—28 Ma, existing 
†Otarocyon 34—30 Ma, existing 
†Rhizocyon 33—26 Ma, existing 
Tribe †Phlaocyonini 33—13 Ma, existing 
†Cynarctoides 30—18 Ma, existing 
†Phlaocyon 30—19 Ma,
Tribe †Borophagini 30—3 Ma, existing 
†Cormocyon 30—20 Ma, existing 
†Desmocyon 25—16 Ma, existing 
†Metatomarctus 19—16 Ma, existing 
†Euoplocyon 18—16 Ma, existing 
†Psalidocyon 16—13 Ma, existing 
†Microtomarctus 21—13 Ma, existing 
†Protomarctus 20—16 Ma, existing 
†Tephrocyon 16—14 Ma, existing 
Subtribe †Cynarctina 20—10 Ma, existing 
†Paracynarctus 19—16 Ma, existing 
†Cynarctus 16—12 Ma, existing 
Subtribe †Aelurodontina 20—5 Ma, existing 
†Tomarctus 23—16 Ma, existing 
†Aelurodon 16—12 Ma, existing 
Subtribe †Borophagina
†Paratomarctus 16—5 Ma, existing 
†Carpocyon 16—5 Ma, existing 
†Protepicyon 16—12 Ma, existing 
†Epicyon 12—10 Ma, existing 
†Borophagus (=Osteoborus) 12—5 Ma, existing 

Cladogram showing borophagine interrelationships, following Wang et al., figure 141:

Extinction
According to an analysis of the fossil record of North American fossil carnivorans, the decline of borophagines from a diversity of about 30 species 15 million years ago to extinction was largely driven by competition with felids and canines. Felids invaded the continent from Eurasia about 20 million years ago and were better ambush predators, in part due to their retractable claws. Climate change, which led to the replacement of North American forests with grasslands, may also have been a factor; borophagines were less suited to running down prey than canines.
Although these specific species developed powerful limbs that are capable of cracking bones in vicious pounce attacks, other carnivorous species that rely on quick ambush for catching prey were likely more successful than the slower Borophaginae.

References

Further reading

 
Mammal subfamilies
Pliocene extinctions
Oligocene first appearances
Fossil taxa described in 1945